Dean Craig Brown, AO (born 5 April 1943) is a politician who served as the Premier of South Australia between 14 December 1993 and 28 November 1996, and also served as 10th Deputy Premier of South Australia between 22 October 2001 and 5 March 2002, representing the South Australian Division of the Liberal Party of Australia. He became premier when he led the party to a landslide win at the 1993 state election, and lost the office when he lost a leadership challenge to John Olsen in November 1996.

Early life
Prior to entering politics Brown was a research scientist. Brown holds a Bachelor of Rural Science, Diploma in Business Administration, and he earned a Master of Rural Science at the University of New England.

Political career
Dean Brown's political career was marked by his rivalry with John Olsen, the two representing the moderate and conservative wings of the South Australian Liberal Party respectively. He was first elected to the House of Assembly for the safe Liberal seat of Davenport in east Adelaide on 10 March 1973, and joined the Liberal Movement faction of the party. He served in the ministry of David Tonkin from 1979 to 1982. After Tonkin lost the 1982 election and retired from politics, Brown ran in the ensuing leadership contest, losing to Olsen. For the 1985 election, an electoral redistribution left both Brown and Stan Evans, the member for Fisher, vying for Liberal preselection in Davenport. In the ensuing factional battle (Evans is a member of the conservative wing), Brown won preselection, but Evans remained in the race as an "Independent Liberal."  At the election, Brown suffered a swing of 30 percent on the primary vote and 24 percent on the two-party vote, enough to lose the seat to Evans.

Dean Brown returned to politics in 1992. The Labor government of John Bannon was embarrassed by the losses of the State Bank of South Australia, but incumbent Opposition Leader Dale Baker was unable to capitalize.  Baker resigned and called a spill for all leadership positions. It initially appeared that Olsen, who had been appointed to the Australian Senate after losing the 1989 state election, would return to his old post with little difficulty.  The Liberal Party's conservative faction persuaded former Deputy Premier Roger Goldsworthy to resign his safe seat of Kavel and hand it to Olsen, and Baker intended to hand the leadership back to Olsen as soon as he was securely back in the legislature. However, a number of moderate Liberals were unwilling to let Olsen take the leadership unopposed. They persuaded leading party moderate Ted Chapman to stand down from his equally safe seat of Alexandra on the Fleurieu Peninsula and hand it to Brown so he could challenge Olsen for the leadership. This allowed both Brown and Olsen to re-enter parliament at by-elections on the same day, the 1992 Kavel by-election and 1992 Alexandra by-election respectively. In the ensuing ballot, Brown narrowly defeated Olsen.

Bannon retired in late 1992 and was succeeded by Lynn Arnold.  However, Arnold was unable to change Labor's fortunes, and Brown went into the 1993 election as an unbackable favorite to be the state's next premier.  At that election, Brown led the Liberals to one of the biggest landslides ever recorded at the state level in Australia.  They took 14 seats from Labor and won a record 60.9 percent of the two-party vote.  They also won all but nine seats in Adelaide, Labor's power base for more than half a century—in some cases, taking seats where Labor had not been seriously threatened in decades.  At this election, Brown was elected for Finniss, a reconfigured version of Alexandra.  With a 14-seat majority—the largest in South Australia's history—Brown seemed to be in a formidable position.  Indeed, there was talk that the Liberals would be in power for a generation.

However, he had considerable difficulty reining in his large party room, which was torn by the factional battles that have long plagued the SA Liberals.  He didn't seem to project an image of confident leadership. By late 1996, the Liberals' poll numbers were in clear decline. Well aware that the Liberals had a year at most to recover before the next election, two prominent moderate backbenchers, Joan Hall and Graham Ingerson, the latter having briefly served as Brown's deputy in Opposition, threw their support to Olsen. With Hall and Ingerson's backing, Olsen launched a successful party-room coup against Brown in November.
Hall had been a staffer to then Opposition Leader Brown prior to the 1993 election which saw Hall being elected to Parliament. However despite Hall having previously worked on his staff, Brown as Premier did not promote Hall to his ministry and as a retaliation Hall switched her support to Olsen. 

Brown became the first premier to leave office without facing an election since Crawford Vaughan.

As a concession to Brown, Olsen named Brown as Minister for Aboriginal Affairs in his government. After the Liberals were narrowly returned at the 1997 election, Brown became Minister for Human Services.

After Olsen was forced to resign as premier in 2001, Brown sought to regain the premiership but lost out to Deputy Premier Rob Kerin. As a concession to Brown, Kerin named Brown deputy leader of the Liberal Party, and hence Deputy Premier. He took on the added portfolios of Disability Services and Ageing.  After the Liberal Party lost government at the 2002 election, Brown became Deputy Opposition Leader until 2005 when he announced that he would leave politics at the 2006 election, and resigned the deputy leadership.

In October 2007, Brown was appointed special drought adviser to South Australian Premier Mike Rann.

References

External links
Parliamentary Profile: SA Parliament website

|-

|-

|-

|-

|-

|-

|-

1943 births
Living people
Liberal Party of Australia members of the Parliament of South Australia
Premiers of South Australia
Deputy Premiers of South Australia
Officers of the Order of Australia
Leaders of the Opposition in South Australia
Liberal and Country League politicians
21st-century Australian politicians
20th-century Australian politicians